Datuk Christopher Wan Soo Kee (born ) is a former Malaysian police officer who served as director of the Bukit Aman Criminal Investigation Department.

He was the first Chinese senior police officer appointed as director of the Bukit Aman Criminal Investigation Department.

Early life
Christopher Wan Soo Kee was born in 1951 in Ayer Hitam, Penang.

Police career
Wan joined the Police Force on 11 November 1969 as a Probationary Inspector. He served in multiple departments such as Bukit Aman Special Branch Staff Officer from 1970 to 1997, Assistant Director of Management (Administration) Bukit Aman from 1997 to 2000, and Head of Kuala Lumpur Special Branch from 2000 to 2002. He was appointed as Malacca Police Chief from 1 July 2002 to 2005. Later, Penang Police Chief from 1 February 2005 to 2006. Lastly, he was appointed as Director of Bukit Aman Criminal Investigation Department from 1 November 2006 to 2008, Christopher Wan Soo Kee was 55 years old when he served as Director of Bukit Aman Criminal Investigation Department, but he service term extended. He retired on 9 January 2008 at the age of 57.

During his tenure as Director of Bukit Aman Criminal Investigation Department, he led the investigation of the murder of Nurin Jazlin.

Honours
 :
 Officer of the Order of the Defender of the Realm (KMN) (1998)
 Commander of the Order of Meritorious Service (PJN) - Datuk (2007)
 :
 Companion Class I of the Exalted Order of Malacca (DMSM) - Datuk (2002)
 :
 Companion of the Order of the Defender of State (DMPN) - Dato’ (2006)

References

Malaysian police officers
Officers of the Order of the Defender of the Realm
Commanders of the Order of Meritorious Service
1951 births
Living people
People from Penang